Big Chico Creek is a creek in northeastern California that originates near Colby Mountain in Lassen National Park. It flows  to its confluence with the Sacramento River in Butte County. Big Chico Creek forms part of the demarcation between the Sierra Nevada and the Cascade Range.

A portion of Big Chico Creek flows through the city of Chico's Bidwell Park and California State University, Chico.

Natural history
There are numerous plant and animal species in the riparian zone and entire watershed of Big Chico Creek. A threatened species of Chinook Salmon make annual spawning runs up Big Chico Creek to the area of Higgin's Hole. Among the wildflowers documented in the watershed is the yellow mariposa lily, Calochortus luteus.

See also 
 Little Chico Creek

References
 C. Michael Hogan. 2009. Yellow Mariposa Lily: Calochortus luteus, GlobalTwitcher.com, ed. N. Stromberg
 United States Geological Survey. 1981.

Notes

Tributaries of the Sacramento River
Rivers of Butte County, California
Rivers of Tehama County, California
Geography of Chico, California
Geography of the Sacramento Valley
Rivers of Northern California